George Lawler (born 1 September 1995) is an English professional rugby league footballer who plays as a  or  for the Castleford Tigers in the Super League.

He has previously played for Hull Kingston Rovers in the Super League, and has spent time at the Newcastle Thunder and the York City Knights in League 1 on dual registration from Hull KR.

Background
Lawler was born in Kingston upon Hull, East Riding of Yorkshire, England.

Playing career

Hull Kingston Rovers
Lawler is a former West Hull amateur, George is a product of and another player to blossom through the ranks of the City of Hull Academy, before he started spending more time with the Hull Kingston Rovers' first-team squad.

On 23 August 2015, he made his try scoring début against the Widnes Vikings in an 8-12 victory in The Qualifiers.

It was revealed on 2 March 2016 that Lawler had signed a four-year contract at Hull Kingston Rovers following an impressive start to his professional playing career.

Lawler suffered relegation from the Super League with Hull Kingston Rovers in the 2016 season, due to losing the Million Pound Game at the hands of the Salford Red Devils.

12-months later however, Lawler was part of the Hull Kingston Rovers' side that won promotion back to the Super League, at the first time of asking following relegation the season prior.

It was announced on 4 May 2018 that Lawler had penned a new three-year contract extension to remain at Hull Kingston Rovers until at least the end of the 2021 rugby league season.

Castleford Tigers
On 5 October 2021 it was reported that Lawler had signed for the Castleford Tigers in the Super League.

For the 2022 season, Lawler claimed squad number 10 which was vacated by the retiring Grant Millington. He made his Castleford debut on 11 February against the Salford Red Devils, and scored his first try for the club on 26 March against the Leeds Rhinos.

References

External links
Hull KR profile
SL profile

1995 births
Living people
Castleford Tigers players
England Knights national rugby league team players
Hull Kingston Rovers players
Newcastle Thunder players
Rugby league hookers
Rugby league locks
Rugby league players from Kingston upon Hull
York City Knights players